Tasmania Parks and Wildlife Service is the government body responsible for protected areas of Tasmania on public land, such as national parks, historic sites and regional reserves. Historically it has also had responsibility for managing wildlife, including game.

History
The National Parks and Wildlife Service was set up on 1 November 1971 after controversy surrounding the proposal to flood Lake Pedder and the unsuccessful attempts to prevent the project going ahead. A Select Committee formed from the interested parties recommended the establishment of a professional park service to properly manage the natural environment in Tasmania. The service initially had a staff of 59. The National Parks and Wildlife Act 1970 had made provisions for the conservation of fauna and flora and the establishment and management of national parks. Mount William, Maria Island and Narawntapu National Parks were set up and Macquarie Island designated as a nature reserve.

The creation of an Archaeology Section within the service followed the Aboriginal Relics Act 1975. In the following year Precipitous Bluff was incorporated into the Southwest National Park. Controversy in 1979 over the proposed Lower Gordon hydro-electric power scheme, which would have meant flooding the Franklin River led to the creation of the Franklin-Lower Gordon Wild Rivers National Park in 1981 (construction of the dam was stopped by a court ruling in 1983).

In 1987 the service was merged with the Department of Lands to form the Department of Lands, Parks and Wildlife and relocated to new premises.

In 1989 the Department of Lands, Parks and Wildlife became the Department of Environment and Planning and Department of Parks, Wildlife and Heritage, managing Crown land as well as the reserves, and with duties to conserve wildlife and historic heritage sites. The Royal Tasmanian Botanical Gardens and the Port Arthur Historic Site Management Authority also became part of the Department.

In the same year the Douglas-Apsley National Park, important for its dry sclerophyll forests, was established in the east of the state. The Tasmanian Wilderness World Heritage Area was expanded to include the Central Plateau Conservation Area.

In 1990, Tasmania's first marine reserves were established at Maria Island, Governor Island, Tinderbox and Ninepins Point.

On 3 February 1993, the Department once again merged, this time with the Department of Environment and Land Management (DELM), with The Parks and Wildlife Service functioning as a separate division within the department. In 1993 the introduction of park fees allowed the service to fund projects aimed at visitors including visitor centres and official trails.

Some land previously managed by the service was transferred to Aboriginal Land Council of Tasmania and an Aboriginal Heritage Unit was created to provide training for Aboriginal community members, to allow them to advise on Aboriginal heritage management.

In 1996 the Mole Creek Karst National Park was created and South Bruny National Park followed in October 1997.

Under the Regional Forestry Agreement (RFA) an extra  of public land were added to Tasmania's reserves, expanding the amount of public land in reserves by 17%. The RFA also expanded Mount William National Park, Freycinet National Park and created Tasman and Savage River National Parks.

A further departmental merger occurred after the 1998 elections with an amalgamation into the Department of Primary Industries and Fisheries and the Government Analytical and Forensic Laboratories (GAFL) creating the Department of Primary Industries, Water and Environment (DPIWE).

The Parks and Wildlife Service was split into two separate divisions: the Resource Management and Conservation Division had responsibility for the natural and cultural resources and the Parks and Wildlife Service covered Tasmania's parks, reserves and World Heritage Areas. The Parks and Wildlife Service was separated from the Department of Primary Industries, Water and Environment following the 2002 State elections, becoming part of the Department of Tourism, Parks, Heritage and the Arts (DTPHA), while the Resource Management and Conservation Division remained part of the DPIWE.

In 2002 three islands, Deal, Erith and Dover were declared as part of the Kent Group National Park and marine protected areas were created there and at Port Davey-Bathurst Harbour.

In April 2006 the Department incorporated the Environment Division from Department of Primary Industries, Water and Environment. This led to a renaming of the Department to the Department of Tourism, Arts and the Environment (DTAE).

In 2007 the Tasmanian Coast Conservation Fund was established. Tour company operator Robert Pennicott founder of Bruny Island Cruises and Tasman Island Cruises came together with environmental group WILDCARE to establish the fund. While operating separately to the Tasmanian Parks and Wildlife Service, the fund is used to provide funding to the Parks and Wildlife Service to assist environmental protection and conservation projects in Tasmania's National Parks.

See also
Australasian Fire and Emergency Service Authorities Council

Notes

External links
 

1971 establishments in Australia
Parks
Organizations established in 1971
Protected area administrators of Australia
Protected areas of Tasmania